The Vidhyeshvari Vajra Yogini Temple - also known as the Bijeśvarī Vajrayoginī, Bidjeshwori Bajra Jogini, Bijayaswar, Bidjeswori, or Visyasvari Temple - is a Newar Buddhist temple in the Kathmandu valley dedicated to the Vajrayāna Buddhist deity Vajrayoginī (or Bajra Jogini in the Newar language) in her form as Akash Yogini. The temple stands on the west bank of the Bishnumati river next to  the ancient religious site of the  Ramadoli (Karnadip) cremation ground and is on the main path from Swayambhunath stupa (to the west) to Kathmandu.

Significance
In the Kathmandu valley of Nepal there are several important Newar temples dedicated to different forms of Vajrayogini. These temples include the Sankhu Vajrayogini temple, Vidhyeshvari Vajrayogini temple, Parping Vajrayogini temple,   Pulchowk Khagayogini temple and the Guhyeshwari temple.

Vīdyādharī, the 'Knowledge Holder', is the presiding deity of this temple.

The Temple is an important pilgrimage place for Tibetan Buddhists and there is a recently constructed Tibetan Buddhist temple nearby. Nepali Hindus regard the place as a sacred Shaktipeeth.
The Hindu devi temple of Sobha Baghwati stands nearby.

Architecture

The main three storied Newa pagoda style temple is the NW corner of the bahal courtyard which has a gateway facing the river.

Images
In the temple the main image (idol) is of Akash Yogini flying through the sky, her right leg bent up at the knee behind her, and her left leg is pulled up against her breasts with her left arm. Her right arm is behind her holding a vajra above the sole of her right foot. In the crook of her right arm she holds a khaṭvāṅga  staff which rests on her left shoulder. This image is about 18 inches high.

See also
Newar Buddhism
Vajrayogini

References

Other sources
 - used to find transliteration of Sanskrit names and additional information on Vajrayoginī.

Further reading
Slusser, Mary Shepherd. Nepal Mandala: A Cultural Study of the Kathmandu Valley (Two Volumes), Princeton University Press 1982. 
Pruscha, Carl. Kathmandu Valley - The Preservation of Physical Environment and Cultural Heritage - A Protective Inventory, Vol. 2, Wien 1975
Seemann, Heinrich. Nepal 2029, Stuttgart 1973

External links

Vajrayogini temples
Buddhist temples in Nepal
Nepalese culture
Bahals in Kathmandu
Newar religion
World Heritage Sites in Nepal
Buddhist pilgrimage sites in Nepal
17th-century establishments in Nepal